Kimathi Donkor (born in 1965) is a London-based contemporary British artist of Ghanaian, Anglo-Jewish and Jamaican family heritage whose figurative paintings depict "African diasporic bodies and souls as sites of heroism and martydom, empowerment and fragility...myth and matter". According to art critic Coline Milliard, Donkor's works are ""genuine cornucopias of interwoven reference: to Western art, social and political events, and to the artist's own biography".

Early life and education

Donkor was born in Bournemouth, England, in 1965. He has said of his background: "I was born in the UK to an Anglo-Jewish mother and Ghanaian father, but was raised by my adopted parents who were from Jamaica and the UK. We lived for a time in Zambia, Central Africa, where my adopted dad worked as a vet. I finished my schooling in the west of England, then moved to London, where I eventually settled. In the meantime, my adopted parents had divorced and remarried, so the family diversity actually increased, as Zambians also joined the party. This smörgåsbord life induced an early sense of the wondrous, and sometimes maddening, complexity of identities and histories, which, I think, has been reflected in my artworks. Precisely because I was such an intimate witness to the multiple crossings and re-crossings of stories, images and journeys from around the world."

Donkor received an Art Foundation Diploma from Bournemouth and Poole College of Arts followed by a BA (Hons) degree in fine art from Goldsmiths College, University of London, and a master's degree in fine art at Camberwell College of Arts. He earned his PhD at Chelsea College of Arts in 2016. He also participated in community education initiatives such as Black History for Action. In 2011, he was the recipient of the Derek Hill Foundation Scholarship for the British School at Rome.

Career and works

Works by Kimathi Donkor are held by significant UK and international collections, including at the International Slavery Museum, Wolverhampton Art Gallery, the Sindika Dokolo Collection and the British Museum. His history paintings "fearlessly tackle key, dramatic, monumental moments of African diaspora history ... with a painterly preciseness that borders on aesthetic frugality", according to art historian Eddie Chambers. In 2005, Time Out magazine reported that officers from London's Metropolitan Police had entered the Bettie Morton Gallery to demand the removal of one of the artist's paintings, Helping With Enquiries (1984), from his solo exhibition Fall/Uprising (which addressed policing controversies). Gallery staff refused to comply and police later issued a statement that "no further action" would be taken against the painter.

The artist's "Queens of the Undead" paintings depict historic female commanders from Africa and the African Diaspora, but with contemporary Londoners as models. Prior to featuring in Donkor's 2012 solo show at London's Institute of International Visual Arts (Iniva), some works from the series were exhibited at the Ciccillo Matarazzo Pavilion in São Paulo, Brazil, for the 29th São Paulo Biennial in 2010.

Caroline Menezes suggested that Donkor's work, "articulates a hidden history, tales of the past and chronicles of suppressed voices", with figures such as Nanny of the Maroons, Nzinga Mbande, Stephen Lawrence, Joy Gardner, Toussaint L'Ouverture and Jean Charles de Menezes among the subjects addressed. Writing about his 2013, London solo show, Daddy, I want to be a black artist, Yvette Greslé proposed Donkor as “one of the most significant figurative painters, of his generation, working in the United Kingdom today”. In 2017, works by the artist were featured in the Diaspora Pavilion  during the 57th Venice Biennale, and in 2019 he won the DiLonghi Art Projects Artists Award at the London Art Fair.

Curating and art teaching
In 2008, Donkor was commissioned to curate the touring group show Hawkins & Co at Liverpool's Contemporary Urban Centre, featuring 70 works by 15 artists, including Raimi Gbadamosi, Keith Piper, George "Fowokan" Kelly and Chinwe Chukwuogo Roy MBE. The show, which toured to Liverpool from London, marked the bicentenary of Parliament's Act to Abolition the Slave Trade. In 2009, Donkor embarked on a three-year project at Tate Britain, Seeing Through, which engaged a group of young people from London foster homes in producing and exhibiting art at the museum. Dr Donkor is a senior lecturer at the University of the Arts, London and in 2019 was appointed as Course Leader for the BA (Hons) in Painting at Camberwell College of Arts.

Selected solo exhibitions
2015 Some Clarity of Vision, Gallery MOMO, Johannesburg
2013 Daddy, I want to be a black artist, Peckham Space, London
2012 Queens of the Undead, with InIVA at Rivington Place, London
2008 Hawkins & Co, Market Theatre Gallery, Armagh, Northern Ireland
2005 Fall/Uprising, Bettie Morton Gallery, London
2005 Caribbean Passion: Haiti 1804, Art Exchange Gallery (touring), Nottingham
2004 Caribbean Passion: Haiti 1804, Bettie Morton Gallery, London

Selected group exhibitions
2019: "London Art Fair", Business Design Centre, London, England (Presented by Ed Cross Fine Art).
2018: "Diaspora Pavilion: Venice to Wolverhampton", Wolverhampton Art Gallery, Wolverhampton, England (curated by David A. Bailey and Jess Taylor)
2018: "A History of Drawing", Camberwell Space, London, England (curated by Kelly Chorpening).
2017: "Diaspora Pavilion", Venice Biennale, Palazzo Pisani S. Marina, Venice, Italy (curated by David A. Bailey and Jess Taylor).
2017–18: "Ink And Blood", International Slavery Museum, Liverpool, England (curated by Jean Francois Manicom).
2017: "Untitled: Art on the Conditions of Our Time", New Art Exchange, Nottingham, England (curated by Paul Goodwin and Hansi Momodu-Gordon) 
2013: Entre Trânsitos e Viagens, Carpintaria São Lazaro, Lisbon, Portugal
2013: What's Going On, The Usher Gallery, Lincoln, UK
2012: Invisible Forces, Furtherfield, London
2011: Seven Things To Do In An Emergency, The British School at Rome, Rome, Italy
2010: 29th Bienal de São Paulo, São Paulo, Brazil
2008: Hawkins & Co, Contemporary Urban Centre, Liverpool, UK
2004: Historicism, 198 Contemporary Arts and Learning, London
1985: Young, Black & Here, People's Gallery, London
1985: Artists Against Apartheid, Royal Festival Hall, London

References

Further reading

 Anjos, M., & A. Farias, 2010, 29th Bienal Documentation, São Paulo: Fundação de Bienal São Paulo, 
 Anjos, M., & A. Farias, 2010, 29th Bienal Catalogue, São Paulo: Fundação de Bienal São Paulo, 
 Barbrook, R., 2014. Class Wargames: Ludic subversion against spectacular capitalism, Minor Compositions; distributed by Autonomedia (New York), 
 Benci, J., 2012, Fine Arts 2011-2012, British School at Rome (Rome), 
 Bernier, Celeste-Marie, 2019. Stick to the Skin: African American and Black British Art, 1965–2015. University of California Press. 
 Dibosa, D., et al. 2012, Kimathi Donkor: Queens of the Undead Iniva (London), 
 Chambers, E., 2014, Black Artists in British Art: A History from 1950 to the Present, I.B.Tauris (London and New York), 
 Kaisary, P., 2014, The Haitian Revolution in the Literary Imagination, London and Charlottesville: University of Virginia Press, 
 Miranda, M., & A. Páscoa, 2014, Offline: Between Transits and Journeys, Lisbon: XEREM Associação Cultural, 
 Miller, M., 2013, Seeing Through, London: Tate Young People's Programmes

External links
 Kimathi Donkor's official website 
 Kimathi Donkor's page at Gallery MOMO, Johannesburg, South Africa.
 Kimathi Donkor's page at Omenka Gallery, Lagos, Nigeria.
 Kimathi Donkor's page at Ed Cross Fine Art, London, UK.

20th-century English painters
English male painters
21st-century English painters
Alumni of Camberwell College of Arts
Alumni of Chelsea College of Arts
Alumni of Goldsmiths, University of London
English contemporary artists
Black British artists
1965 births
Living people
English people of Ghanaian descent
English people of Jewish descent
Alumni of Arts University Bournemouth
Artists from Bournemouth
21st-century English male artists
20th-century English male artists